8th Visual Effects Society Awards
February 10, 2010

Best Visual Effects in a Visual Effects Driven Motion Picture:
Avatar

The 8th Visual Effects Society Awards, given on February 10, 2010 at the Century Plaza Hotel in Los Angeles, honored the best visual effects in film and television of 2009. The show was hosted by Sam Rubin and broadcast, in an edited form, by the ReelzChannel on March 5, 2010.

Winners and nominees
(winners in bold)

Honorary Awards
Lifetime Achievement Award:
James Cameron
George Melies Award for Pioneering:
Dr. Ed Catmull

Film

Television

Other categories

References

External links
 Visual Effects Society

2009
Visual Effects Society Awards
Visual Effects Society Awards
Visual Effects Society Awards
Visual Effects Society Awards
Visual Effects Society Awards